The 1895 Mississippi gubernatorial election took place on November 5, 1895, in order to elect the Governor of Mississippi. Incumbent Democrat John Marshall Stone was term-limited, and could not run for reelection to a second consecutive term.

Background
A new state constitution was adopted in 1890, which extended Stone's term to six years. Determined to keep control and maintain white supremacy, the Democratic-dominated legislature effectively disfranchised most African Americans in the state by adding a requirement to the constitution for voter registration for payment of poll taxes. Two years later, they passed laws requiring literacy tests (administered by white officials in a discriminatory way), and grandfather clauses (the latter  benefited white citizens). These requirements, with additions in legislation of 1892, resulted in a 90% reduction in the number of blacks who voted in Mississippi. In every county a handful of prominent black ministers and local leaders were allowed to vote. African Americans were essentially excluded from the political system for 70 years, until after passage of federal civil rights legislation in the mid-1960s.

General election
In the general election, Democratic candidate Anselm J. McLaurin, a former U.S. Senator, defeated Populist nominee Frank Burkitt, a newspaper editor and state representative.

Results

References

1895
gubernatorial
Mississippi
November 1895 events